IK Frej is a Swedish sports club located in Täby kyrkby. It currently plays in Division 4, the sixth tier in Swedish football.

Background
IK Frej was founded 5 February 1968 by Åke Berghagen and his friends. Today, IK Frej has more than 1200 members, most of whom are active in the football section. Approximately 50% of the youngsters aged 7–17 years in Täby Kyrkby are members of the club.

The club is named after the Norse god Freyr, Frej in Swedish, and has a picture of a viking with a horned helmet in their crest.

Since 1968 IK Frej has participated mainly in the middle and lower divisions of the Swedish football league system. The club played in Superettan, the second tier of Swedish football, between 2015 and 2019. They play their home matches at the Vikingavallen in Täby.

In 2021, after several years of financial difficulties, IK Frej withdrew from Division 1 to join Division 4 instead. Affiliated club Hammarby IF in Allsvenskan, that had provided resources in forms of funds and loan players for several years, decided to form Hammarby Talangfotbollsförening  that took the place of IK Frej in Division 1.

IK Frej are affiliated to the Stockholms Fotbollförbund.

Coaching staff

First team

History
 Daniel Lundkvist (2021–2022)
 Alni Sharifpour (2022–)

Season to season

Attendances

In recent seasons IK Frej have had the following average attendances:

Achievements

League
 Division 1 Norra:
 Runners-up (1): 2014

References

External links
 IK Frej – Official website

Football clubs in Stockholm County
Association football clubs established in 1968
1968 establishments in Sweden